Metropolitan Community College (Metro or MCC) is a public community college in Omaha, Nebraska. It has multiple campuses throughout the Omaha-Council Bluffs metropolitan area.

MCC serves residents of Dodge, Douglas, Sarpy and Washington Counties. Accredited by the Higher Learning Commission, MCC is the largest post-secondary institution in Nebraska.

MCC offers more than 100 one- and two-year career programs in business administration, computer and office technologies, culinary arts, industrial and construction technologies, nursing and allied health, social sciences and services, and visual and electronic technologies, as well as academic transfer programs. General support courses, classes for business and industry, and continuing education courses also are important parts of the college.

History 
The college began in 1971, when the Nebraska State Legislature consolidated eight technical community college areas into six for about 2000 employees. Metropolitan Technical Community College's first campus, a former warehouse at 132nd and I streets, offered 46 programs and had a total student population of 1,059. Within four years, the Fort Omaha, South Omaha and Elkhorn Valley campuses were established. In the 1980s, the college began offering credit courses at Offutt Air Force Base and the Omaha Correctional Center, and services to Dodge County residents increased with the opening of the Fremont Center in a leased location. By the fall of 1988, college enrollment had grown to 6,630 students.

In 1992, the Nebraska Legislature changed the college's name to Metropolitan Community College. The following year, the Sarpy County Center opened in Brentwood Crossing Center in La Vista; the new Sarpy Center and public library opened in 1999.

By 2003, credit enrollment at the college totaled 23,623 students, making it the second largest post-secondary institution in Nebraska. As enrollment continued to grow at a record level, expanded physical facilities followed. Four new or renovated sites opened in 2007: the Applied Technology Center, the renovated Elkhorn Valley Campus, the new Fremont Area Center location and the South Omaha Connector Building.

In 2009, the Institute for the Culinary Arts and the Merle and Joy Swanson Conference Center opened, adding 35,000 square feet of classroom and meeting space and creating a new main entrance off Sorensen Parkway. A year later, the renovated historic Mule Barn opened to provide meeting space for the MCC board of governors, classrooms and outreach offices.

In 2012, MCC Express-Vinton opened, offering educational services to the community, with an emphasis on adult education services including GED prep and English-as-a-Second language, community literacy services including Read-Right tutoring, and individualized reading programs and career exploration.

In 2011-12, enrollment was 32,765 credit students and 17,374 noncredit students.

In 2014, MCC announced the Fort Omaha Campus expansion project. Three new buildings — The Center for Advanced and Emerging Technology, Construction Education Center and Academic Skills Center — will focus on training students. MCC is considering offering student housing at this location.

MCC has campuses in North Omaha at Fort Omaha, in South Omaha, and in Elkhorn, as well as centers in Bellevue, La Vista and Fremont, the Applied Technology Center and classes at Offutt Air Force Base, and multiple area high schools and offsite locations.

Governance
The college is governed by an 11-member board of governors. The members represent five districts with one member at large. Members serve four-year terms.

See also 
 Education in North Omaha, Nebraska
 Do Space

References

Further reading

External links 
 Official website

Education in North Omaha, Nebraska
Two-year colleges in the United States
Community colleges in Nebraska
Educational institutions established in 1974
Buildings and structures in Omaha, Nebraska